Island Grove is an unincorporated community in New Berlin Township Sangamon County, Illinois, United States.

References

Unincorporated communities in Sangamon County, Illinois
Unincorporated communities in Illinois